Daniel M. Ashe is the President and CEO of the Association of Zoos and Aquariums.

Ashe was the Director of the United States Fish and Wildlife Service (USFWS) from February 2011 to January 2017. The United States Senate held a hearing on his nomination on February 15, 2011 and confirmed him to the post by unanimous consent on June 30, 2011.  Ashe used to be Deputy Director for Policy of the United States Fish and Wildlife Service (USFWS). His prior positions included being a member of the staff of the Committee on Merchant Marine and Fisheries (1982–95), Chief of the National Wildlife Refuge System (1998-2003), and Science Advisor to the Director of the USFWS (2003).

Ashe graduated from the University of Washington with a degree in Marine Affairs, and also earned a Bachelor of Science degree in biological science from Florida State University. He wrote his master's thesis on wetland mitigation, and it was published in the Coastal Zone Management Journal in 1982.

He lives in Maryland with his family.

References 

Florida State University alumni
United States Fish and Wildlife Service personnel
University of Washington College of the Environment alumni
Living people
Year of birth missing (living people)
American nonprofit chief executives
People from Maryland